Carolyn Hayes (born 1 March 1988 in Newcastle West) is an Irish triathlete.

She competed in the women's event at the 2020 Summer Olympics, as the only Irish triathlete in the event. Formerly a water polo player, she only began competing in the triathlon in her 20s, putting a medical career on hold to train for the Olympics beginning in 2018. She was inspired to compete in the Olympics by the 2012 performances of British triathletes Alistair Brownlee and Jonny Brownlee. She finished 23rd in the event.

References

External links
 

1988 births
Living people
Irish female triathletes
Olympic triathletes of Ireland
Triathletes at the 2020 Summer Olympics
Place of birth missing (living people)